Jeffrey Hambley Cuthbert (born 4 June 1948) is a Welsh politician serving as Gwent Police and Crime Commissioner since 2016. Cuthbert served as a Labour Party member of the National Assembly for Wales for Caerphilly from 2003 to 2016. He began his career in the mining industry and later worked for the Welsh Joint Education Committee (as it was then) as Head of the Asset to Industry Unit.

Cuthbert was born in Glasgow to a Welsh mother and Scottish father, but brought up in Cardiff, where he attended Whitchurch County Secondary Modern followed by studying mining engineering at University College, Cardiff. He joined the Labour Party in the mid-1960s. As a mining engineer he worked at Markham and Oakdale pits.

A member of the Militant group from the mid-60s to early-80s, Cuthbert later became Chair of Caerphilly Constituency Labour Party. He left the mining industry to develop qualifications for Modern Apprenticeships with WJEC, and became a Corporate Member of the Chartered Institute of Personnel and Development. He was a governor of the Lewis School, Pengam, and served as principal of a part-time Adult Education Centre at Aberbargoed.

In the 2003 election to the National Assembly for Wales, Cuthbert was selected at the last minute to replace Ron Davies who stood down following a sex scandal. He increased the Labour majority in the Caerphilly constituency.

Cuthbert was appointed chair of the Objective One Programme Monitoring Committee for Wales in 2004, and subsequently Chair of its All-Wales successor body in 2007. He is a Chair of the Assembly's Cross-Party Groups on Healthy Living and the Built Environment; and is co-chair of the Cross-Party Group on Beer and the Pub. As an active trade unionist, he is co-ordinator of the UNITE Group of Labour Assembly Members. At the 2007 election he successfully defended his seat after Ron Davies, challenged to regain it as an Independent candidate.

At the 2011 Welsh General Election, Cuthbert successfully defended his seat once again, after another challenge from Davies, who this time stood for Plaid Cymru.

In March 2012 he was appointed Deputy Minister for Skills and Technology and was joined the Cabinet in June 2013 as Minister for Communities and Tackling Poverty in the Welsh Government.

In September 2014 he announced his decision to stand down as Caerphilly AM at the 2016 elections. Because of that, he also stood down from the Welsh Government Cabinet.

In May 2016 Cuthbert was elected as Gwent Police and Crime Commissioner.

References

External links
Jeffrey Cuthbert AM homepage
National Assembly for Wales Member profile

Offices held

1948 births
Wales AMs 2003–2007
Wales AMs 2007–2011
Wales AMs 2011–2016
Welsh Labour members of the Senedd
Living people
Militant tendency supporters
Politicians from Glasgow
Politicians from Cardiff
Alumni of Cardiff University
Labour Party police and crime commissioners
Police and crime commissioners in Wales